English High School can refer to:

English High School of Boston

Listings on the National Register of Historic Places:
 English High School (Lynn, Massachusetts)
 English High School (Worcester, Massachusetts)